Vanzone con San Carlo is a comune (municipality) in the Province of Verbano-Cusio-Ossola in the Italian region Piedmont, located about  northeast of Turin and about  west of Verbania.

Vanzone con San Carlo borders the following municipalities: Antrona Schieranco, Bannio Anzino, Calasca-Castiglione, Ceppo Morelli.

References

Cities and towns in Piedmont